Jerry Shigekazu Tondo (born October 10, 1950) is a Japanese-American actor and voice actor. He is known for providing the voice of the character "Chien-Po" in the animated film Mulan. Other titles Tondo has contributed to include Gung Ho, The Secret Saturdays and Mulan II.

Biography
Tondo discovered acting while attending high school in San Francisco, California. He was offered scholarships to play football, but decided to study sociology. He then enrolled in a theater course. He served on the board of directors while participating as a company member of the Asian American Theater Co. He moved to Los Angeles, California and started working with the East-West Players. Five years later he joined the Mark Taper Forum/Improvisation Theater Project. For six years he toured with the project. He was also a performing member of Cold Tofu Improv. He currently resides with his wife and two children in Manhattan Beach, California.

Filmography

References

External links
 

1950 births
Living people
20th-century American male actors
21st-century American male actors
American male film actors
American male television actors
American male video game actors
American male voice actors
American people of Japanese descent
Male actors from San Francisco